"Love Conquers All" is a single by new wave group ABC, released as the lead single from their sixth studio album Abracadabra in July 1991.

The song's music video, shot mostly in black-and-white, features scenes of various people doing random actions, intercut with footage of Martin Fry and Mark White performing the song and the seahorse from the Abracadabra album cover.

Critical reception
Upon its release, Paul Lester of Melody Maker praised the song as a "sparkling addition to the ABC oeuvre" and described it as "disco as in 'Southern Freeez' or an old Whispers love-thing". He noted the band "continue to face tomorrow with their best foot dancefloorward" and added that the B-side, "What's Good About Goodbye?", "makes me long for that pre-Pixies/Roses, pre-postantirockist time when bands yearned to sound modern and technologically advanced". Sally Margaret Joy of Melody Maker was less enthusiastic in her review, calling the song "merely vapid", with the "only clue to a former glory [being] the upward bubbling of a watery whistle during the verses". She also noted the "pick 'n' mix chocolate box lyrics" that "passed muster" on The Lexicon of Love, but "sound all wrong now". Andrew Collins of NME commented that the song "sounds like ABC would've sounded in 1982 if it had been 1991, if you see what I mean". He added, "It's so slick it just slid off my turntable and then slimed off down the road. No great loss, really."

Track listing

Charts

References

ABC (band) songs
1991 songs
Songs written by Mark White (musician)
Songs written by Martin Fry
EMI Records singles
Parlophone singles
1991 singles
Music videos directed by Mark Romanek